Mole City is an album by the American indie band Quasi. The album was officially announced by the band via a video trailer in May 2013, with a track listing and pre-orders made available the following June. It was released on October 1, 2013, on Kill Rock Stars and Domino Records in the US and UK, respectively.

Track listing
 "*"
 "You Can Stay But You Gotta Go"
 "See You on Mars"
 "Blasted"
 "Chrome Duck"
 "Chumps of Chance"
 "Fat Fanny Land"
 "Nostalgia Kills"
 "R.I.P."
 "Headshrinker"
 "Bedbug Town"
 "The Goat"
 "Geraldine"
 "Loopy"
 "Double Deuce"
 "Gnot"
 "Dust of the Sun"
 "Mole City"
 "An Ice Cube in the Sun"
 "One & Done"
 "The Dying Man"
 "Clap Trap"
 "New Western Way"
 "Beyond the Return of the Sun of Nowhere"

Personnel
Sam Coomes – vocals, guitars, Roxichord, keyboards, recording engineer, mixing, producer
Janet Weiss – vocals, drums, recording engineer, mixing, producer
Aindriaís Dolan – cover illustration
Dana Mozer – photography
Timothy Stollenwerk – mastering

References

2013 albums
Quasi albums
Kill Rock Stars albums
Domino Recording Company albums